The Nineteenth ministry of United Andhra Pradesh (which is referred as the Second N. Chandrababu Naidu ministry) of the state of United Andhra Pradesh was formed on 11 October 1999 headed by N. Chandrababu Naidu as the Chief Minister following the 1999 Andhra Pradesh Legislative Assembly election. The cabinet was sworn in at a simple ceremony held at Raj Bhavan, Hyderabad. Initially the chief minister and eight other ministers of his council of ministers were administered the oath of office and secrecy by the then Governor C. Rangarajan. The cabinet was later expanded and reshuffled for four times citing several reasons on different occasions during the five year tenure until to end on 14 May 2004.

Background
The 1999 Andhra Pradesh legislative assembly elections were swept by the Telugu Desam Party (TDP). The TDP bagged 180 seats in the election and formed the government. N. Chandrababu Naidu incumbent chief minister of United Andhra Pradesh continued to be the chief minister for the second term. The Second N. Chandrababu Naidu Ministry was initially constituted with a nine member council consisting of the chief minister and other eight ministers on 11 October 1999 with a formal oath taking ceremony at the Raj Bhavan, Hyderabad constituted by the then Governor C Rangarajan. The eight ministers constituted a combination of seven cabinet rank ministers and one minister of state. The cabinet was expanded by inducting twenty six new ministers, Increasing the strength of the cabinet to thirty five. Besides the chief minister, the council consisted of twenty six cabinet ministers and eight ministers of state on 22 October 1999. Later with the assassination of the incumbent cabinet rank minister Alimineti Madhava Reddy on 7 March 2000, his wife Uma Madhava Reddy was inducted into the cabinet to substitute the vacant ministry post on 6 November 2000. 

Later with the death of the incumbent minister Karnam Ramachandra Rao on 13 May 2002 due to ill health and the resignation of other two incumbent ministers, where the Suddala Devaiah, minister of state quit of murder charge on 17 June 2002 and Pocharam Srinivas Reddy in September 2002 on allegations in the involvement of the minister in a corruption, paved way for another set of expansion and reshuffling of the council. On 11 September 2002, the council had a minor reshuffling with the ministerial duties of the existing ministers, and inducting three new ministers into the cabinet. The council reshuffling majorly involved the induction of ministers from the Telangana region. The council further remained the same until the end of the legislative tenure i.e 14 May 2004.

Prior to the minor council reshuffling in 2002, the council witnessed a major council reshuffling in 2001. On 26 November 2001, the council was reshuffled by dropping eight ministers and inducting eleven new ones. Council consisting of six cabinet-rank ministers and five ministers of state. The strength of the council stood at thirty nine ministers as of 2001, with twenty nine cabinet-rank ministers and ten ministers of state.

Council of Ministers  

Key
  Assassinated or died in office
  Resigned from office

Notes

See also 
 Andhra Pradesh Council of Ministers
 First N. Chandrababu Naidu ministry
 First Y. S. Rajasekhara Reddy ministry

References

Andhra Pradesh ministries
Telugu Desam Party
1999 establishments in Andhra Pradesh
1999 in Indian politics
2004 disestablishments in India
Cabinets established in 1999
Cabinets disestablished in 2004